Solitude Range, is a subdivision range of the Hart Ranges, of the Northern Rockies in British Columbia, Canada.  The boundaries of the Solitude Range generally lie between the Murray Range and Mountain Creek to the west, Le Moray Creek to the east, the Pine River to the north and Mount Merrick to the south.

Several mountains in the range are named after local area Canadian soldiers killed in action during World War II.

Prominent Peaks

References 

Mountain ranges of British Columbia